Sumargleðin (English: The Summer Joy) were an Icelandic entertainment group that was active in the late 1970s and early 1980s. It was founded in 1972 by Ragnar Bjarnason and Ómar Ragnarsson. It produced several hit songs in Iceland, including  Sumargleðin syngur, Ég fer í fríið, and Prins Póló.

Discography 
 Sumargleðin syngur (1981)
 Af einskærri sumargleði (1984)

References

Icelandic musical groups